The 2010 Baton Rouge Pro Tennis Classic was a professional tennis tournament played on Hard courts. It was part of the 2010 ATP Challenger Tour. It took place in Baton Rouge, United States between 12 and 18 April 2010.

ATP entrants

Seeds

 Rankings are as of April 5, 2010.

Other entrants
The following players received wildcards into the singles main draw:
  Bobby Reynolds
  Devin Britton
  Donald Young
  Alexander Domijan

The following players received entry from the qualifying draw:
  Philip Bester
  Bryan Koniecko
  Cecil Mamiit
  Fritz Wolmarans

Champions

Singles

 Kevin Anderson def.  Tobias Kamke, 6–7(7), 7–6(7), 6–1

Doubles

 Stephen Huss /  Joseph Sirianni def.  Chris Guccione /  Frank Moser, 1–6, 6–2, [13–11]

References
2010 Draws
ITF search 

Baton Rouge Pro Tennis Classic
Tennis tournaments in the United States
Tennis in Louisiana
Baton Rouge Pro Tennis Classic